Biskupice-Pulkov is a municipality and village in Třebíč District in the Vysočina Region of the Czech Republic. It has about 300 inhabitants.

Administrative parts
The municipality is made up of villages of Biskupice and Pulkov.

References

Villages in Třebíč District